Essential services may refer to a class of occupations that have been legislated by a government to have special restrictions in regard to labour actions such as not being allowed to strike.

The International Labour Office, a United Nations agency, distinguishes an essential service from a minimum service.

Industries defined as essential services differ based on the organization or government but generally include services such as hospitals and other healthcare, utilities such as electricity and water supply, law enforcement and firefighting, and food services.

Public health emergencies 
"Essential services" may also refer to those services that are vital to the health and welfare of a population and so are essential to maintain even in a disaster. During the COVID-19 pandemic, many jurisdictions ordered non-essential services to close for several weeks in an effort to control the spread of the virus. The United States Department of Homeland Security's Cybersecurity and Infrastructure Security Agency issued a nation-wide guidance document that defined activities that the Agency had determined to be "essential" to the control of the pandemic and the management of its effects.

Examples of industries in which at least some workers were classified as "essential" during the pandemic included:

 Health care, public health, and human services
 Law enforcement, public safety, and first responders
 Food and agriculture
 Energy
 Water and wastewater
 Transportation and logistics
 Public works
 Communications and information technology
 Other community-based essential functions and government operations
 Critical manufacturing
 Supply chains
 Retail and wholesaling
 Food services and accommodations
 Institutional, residential, commercial, and industrial maintenance
 Manufacturing and production
 Construction
 Financial activities
 Resources
 Environmental services
 Utilities and community services
 Communications industries
 Research
 Justice
 Business regulators and inspectors

References 

Labor relations
Labour law